Ana Debelić (born 9 January 1994) is a Croatian handball player for Vipers Kristiansand and the Croatian national team. 

She started playing handball at the age of six. After enrolling in high school in Rijeka, she played for Opatija and ŽRK Zamet. In Croatia, she also played in Zelina, RK Lokomotiva and RK Podravka Koprivnica. She played for Croatia at four European Championships in 2016 in Sweden, 2018 in France, 2020 in Denmark and 2022 in Slovenia and at World Championship in 2021 in Spain. She won a bronze medal at the championship in Denmark and was chosen in the All-star team in the 2020 European Women's Handball Championship. She was nominated several times for the best world pivot according to Handball Planet.
She got married on Rab in 2021.

Achievements
EHF Champions League:
 Winner: 2021/2022
Norwegian League:
Winner: 2021/22,2022/23
Norwegian Cup:
Winner: 2021/22,2022/23
Croatian league:
Winner: 2014,2017,2018,2019
Croatian cup:
Winner: 2014,2017,2019

Individual awards
 All-Star Line Player of the European Championship: 2020
 Croatian Player of the Year: 2021, 2022

References

External links

1994 births
Living people
Croatian female handball players
Handball players from Rijeka
ŽRK Zamet players
RK Podravka Koprivnica players
Expatriate handball players
Croatian expatriate sportspeople in Russia
21st-century Croatian women